This article details the history of the Croatian Air Force. The Republic of Croatia is a unitary democratic parliamentary republic in Europe at the crossroads of Central Europe, the Mediterranean, and the Southeast Europe. Its capital and largest city is Zagreb. The country is divided into 20 counties and the city of Zagreb. Croatia covers 56,594 square kilometres (21,851 square miles). Croatia's Adriatic Sea coast contains more than a thousand islands. The country's population is 4.29 million. The Croatian Air Force was established on 12 December 1991, during the Croatian War of Independence. After 2003 almost the whole fleet was modernized or completely overhauled.

Early aviation history 
Some of the first pioneers in aviation were from Croatia or of Croatian descent. Faust Vrančić designed and tested the parachute in 1617. First Croat flying in a balloon was Krsto Mazarović over Zagreb in 1789. David Schwarz created the first flyable Rigid airship. Peter Salcher was the creator of the first wind tunnel. Slavoljub Eduard Penkala constructed the first Croatian two-seat aeroplane in 1909 which Dragutin Novak used for his first flight. Katarina Matanović-Kulenović was the first female Croatian pilot. Juan Bielovucic Cavalie was the first pilot of Croatian origin and the founder of aviation in Peru, he enrolled in Voisin brothers pilot school in 1908.  was the first aviator that flew over the Adriatic Sea in 1911. Other notable aircraft constructors were Rudolf Fizir, Mihailo Merćep, Ivan Sarić, Stanko Obad and Robert Ludvigovich Bartini.

World War I 

During World War I, Croatia was part of the Austro-Hungarian Empire. Croatian pilots flew in Austro-Hungarian Imperial and Royal Aviation Troops. Johann Lasi was the first Croatian ace, scoring five victories in only 30 minutes of combat. Miroslav Navratil and Raoul Stojsavljevic were some of the most successful aces in the war, both scoring 10 victories. 

Viktor Klobučar was the first commander of the Austro-Hungarian naval aviation. He established a naval air force and a network of seaplane bases from Istria to the Bay of Kotor. Major Emil Uzelac was a Croatian military commander who was a leading figure in the air forces of the Austro-Hungarian Empire, and later in the Kingdom of Yugoslavia and the Independent State of Croatia. After World War I the Yugoslav Royal Air Force was formed upon the creation of the Kingdom of Serbs, Croats and Slovenes (renamed to Kingdom of Yugoslavia in 1929) in 1918 and existed until Yugoslavia's surrender to Axis powers in 1941 after the Invasion of Yugoslavia during World War II.

World War II 

The Air Force of the Independent State of Croatia came into existence in July 1941. During the war, much of the force's capacity was sent to the Eastern Front as the Croatian Air Force Legion (Croatian: Hrvatska zrakoplovna legija, German: Kroatische Luftwaffen Legion). This consisted of one fighter squadron equipped with Messerschmitt Bf 109 fighters and one bomber squadron equipped with Dornier Do 17 bombers. The fighter squadron served in Russia as part of the German JG 52. Many of the unit's pilots became aces, including; Mato Dukovac, Cvitan Galić, Franjo Džal, and many more. The Air Force of the Independent State of Croatia, the Zrakoplovstvo Nezavisne Države Hrvatske (ZNDH) came into being as early as 19 April 1941, just nine days after the proclamation of the Independent Croat State. Croatia had a large fleet of relatively modern aircraft during the Second World War usually of German origin, but also ex-Royal Yugoslav, Italian, French, British and Czech. The fleet numbered several hundred aircraft, from training biplanes to the latest Messerschmitt 109 fighters. All ZNDH aircraft captured at the end of World War II were incorporated into the Yugoslav People's Army inventory. 

On the Allied side, when the Partisan forces started forming their own air force squadrons (based on donated Allied planes, as well as captured ZNDH aircraft) towards the end of the war, a number of Croats with previous flying experience (NDH defectors, USAAF pilots of Yugoslav descent, pre-war civilian pilots), as well as previously untrained personnel, took part in the effort. Most famous unit was the No. 352 Squadron RAF. Founders of the Partisan Air Force were Croatian pilots Rudi Čajavec and Franjo Kluz. They both received the title of People's Hero of Yugoslavia.

Modern Croatian Air Force 

The Croatian Air Force as it is known now was officially established on December 12, 1991, during the Croatian War of Independence from Yugoslavia. At first, only small agricultural and transport planes, were used to fight a far superior, Serb-led Yugoslav National Army that took almost all aircraft which were, in fact, the property of all ex-Yugoslav states. Some UTVA-75s were fitted with 90-mm rocket-propelled grenades launchers and improvised ordnance like pressurized containers or acetylene tubes filled with explosives, known as "boiler bombs". A number of Antonov An-2 biplanes used for crop-spraying or leased from parachute clubs were also converted by Croatian Forces to drop makeshift bombs and were used in supply missions to the town of Vukovar and other besieged parts of Croatia. The main advantage for the An-2 was that they could take off and land on small or improvised airstrips. They were also used to drop supplies by parachute to isolated garrisons. At least one An-2 was shot down on 2 December 1991 over Vinkovci, eastern Slavonia, by Serbian SAM missiles, with the loss of its crew of four. Among the dead was Commander Marko Živković, the mastermind behind the resupply missions. It is claimed that he developed a GPS navigational system to drop cargoes with an accuracy of 10 metres. Croatia was eventually able to acquire three MiG-21s (brought over by JNA defectors) by late 1992 when the first fighter squadron was formed. Soon, by evading the embargo on weapons, almost 40 MiG-21bis/UM fighters were acquired. Around 25 were put into service while the rest served as a source for spare parts. The helicopter force was basically created during the war period by purchasing around 20 Mil Mi-8 transports and 10 Mi-24 gunships, which were used to a devastating effect in 1995 during Operation Storm. After the war, many aircraft were withdrawn from service, and modern ones were also obtained, notably 20 Pilatus PC-9 and 10 Bell 206B-3 in 1997. After 2003 almost the whole fleet was modernized or completely overhauled. 

The air force obtained 16 Bell OH-58 Kiowa from the US in 2016 and 2017 and these were assigned to the Helicopter Squadron at 93rd air Base.

Croatia has been attempting to replace its ageing MiG-21 fighters with new western fighters.  The country opted to acquire 12 ex-Israeli General Dynamics F-16 Fighting Falcon aircraft in 2017 but the sale was cancelled in early 2019 following inability to obtain relevant export approvals from the USA.  Instead, Croatia purchased 12 French Dessault Rafale fighters in 2021.

See also 
 Austro-Hungarian Imperial and Royal Aviation Troops
 Yugoslav Royal Air Force
 Air Force of the Independent State of Croatia
 Croatian Air Force Legion
 Yugoslav Partisans
 Balkan Air Force
 Yugoslav Air Force
 Croatian Air Force

Notes

Croatia
Aviation history of Croatia
Croatian Air Force
Military history of Croatia